Westmill Woodland Burial Ground is a green burial ground in the Vale of White Horse on the border of Oxfordshire with Wiltshire in southern England. In the distance, the Uffington White Horse, an Iron Age horse carved into the white chalk on the Berkshire Downs, can be seen to the south-east.

The burial ground is in Watchfield parish, north-west of Watchfield village and north of Shrivenham. Close to the site are Westmill Wind Farm and Westmill Solar Park, two renewable energy resources.

The business was founded and is managed by Liz Rothchild, who is also Director of Kicking the Bucket, a festival about living and dying. The community interest company Westmill Woodland Burial Ground C.I.C. runs the ground.

The site is intended for natural burials and is in a rural setting. It won the 2015 Cemetery of the Year award in the 2015 Good Funeral Awards.

Gallery

See also
 List of cemeteries in England

References

External links

 Westmill Woodland Burial Ground website

Year of establishment missing
Cemeteries in Oxfordshire
Vale of White Horse
Environmental organisations based in England
Community interest companies